Olga Alexandrovna Streltsova (born ) is a Russian female track cyclist. She competed at the 2009, 2010, 2011, 2013 and 2014 UCI Track Cycling World Championships.

On 29 May 2011 she broke the track cycling world record of the 500 m time trial, the first record set as a non-amateur record in a time of 29.481. She broke the record again on 30 May 2014 in a time of 29.234 and is till the world record holder.

Career results
2008
3rd  Team Sprint, UEC European U23 Track Championships (with Yulia Kosheleva)
2009
UEC European U23 Track Championships
2nd  Sprint
2nd  Team Sprint (with Victoria Baranova)
3rd  Keirin
2014
Grand Prix of Tula
2nd Team Sprint (with Elena Brejniva)
3rd Sprint
2nd Team Sprint, Memorial of Alexander Lesnikov (with Elena Brejniva)

See also
 World record progression track cycling – Women's flying 500 m time trial

References

External links
 
 
 

1987 births
Living people
Russian track cyclists
Russian female cyclists
Place of birth missing (living people)